Hadendoa (or Hadendowa) is the name of a nomadic subdivision of the Beja people, known for their support of the Mahdiyyah rebellion during the 1880s to 1890s. The area historically inhabited by the Hadendoa lies today in parts of Sudan, Egypt and Eritrea.

Etymology
According to Roper (1930), the name Haɖanɖiwa is made up of haɖa 'lion' and (n)ɖiwa 'clan'. Other variants are Haɖai ɖiwa, Hanɖiwa and Haɖaatʼar (children of lioness).

Language
The language of the Hadendoa is a dialect of Bedawi.

History

The southern Beja were part of the Christian kingdom of Axum during the sixth to fourteenth centuries.
In the fifteenth century, Axum fell to the Islamization of the Sudan region, and although the Beja were never entirely subjugated, they  were absorbed into Islam via marriages and trade contracts. In the seventeenth century, some of the Beja expanded southward, conquering better pastures. These became the Hadendoa, who by the eighteenth century were the dominant people of eastern Sudan, and always at war with the Bisharin tribe.

Extensive anthropological research was done on Egyptian tribes in the late 1800s and a number of skulls of people of the Hadendoa tribe were taken to the Royal College of Surgeons to be measured and studied.

The Hadendoa were traditionally a pastoral people, ruled by a hereditary chief, called a Ma'ahes. One of the best-known chiefs was a Mahdist general named Osman Digna. He led them in the battles, from 1883 to 1898, against the Anglo-Egyptian Sudan (the United Kingdom and Egypt were exercising joint sovereignty in Sudan. They fought the British infantry square in many battles, such as in the Battle of Tamai in 1884 and in the Battle of Tofrek in 1885 and earned an enviable reputation for their bravery.  After the reconquest of the Egyptian Sudan (1896–98), the Hadendoa accepted the new order without demur.

In World War II, the Hadendoa allied themselves with the British against the Italians.

In popular culture
Their elaborately styled hair gained them the name Fuzzy-Wuzzy among British troops during the Mahdist War, after which Rudyard Kipling wrote the poem by the same name.

See also
 History of Anglo-Egyptian Sudan
 Islamization of Sudan
 Mahdist Sudan

References

External links 
 

African nomads
Beja people
Ethnic groups in Egypt
Ethnic groups in Eritrea
Ethnic groups in Sudan
Cushitic-speaking peoples